Centre Township may refer to the following townships in the United States:

 Centre Township, St. Joseph County, Indiana
 Centre Township, Marion County, Kansas
 Centre Township, New Jersey
 Centre Township, Berks County, Pennsylvania
 Centre Township, Perry County, Pennsylvania
 Centre Township, a township that existed in Columbia County, Pennsylvania prior to its splitting into North Centre and South Centre Townships

See also 
 Center Township (disambiguation)